Jorge Gotor Blas (born 14 April 1987) is a Spanish professional footballer who plays for AD San Juan de Mozarrifar as a central defender.

Club career
Born in Zaragoza, Aragon, Gotor graduated from the youth academy of local Real Zaragoza and made his senior debut with their reserves in the 2005–06 season, in Segunda División B. He went on to represent fellow league teams RCD Espanyol B, Real Murcia Imperial, Real Murcia, Getafe CF B, CD Atlético Baleares and CD Guijuelo.

In the summer of 2014, Gotor moved abroad for the first time in his career and signed for Iraqi club Erbil SC alongside compatriot Borja Rubiato. Although he had a contract running until 25 January 2015, he left the country and returned to Spain in August following the bombings of the city.

On 7 August 2015, Gotor returned to the Spanish third level by joining CD Eldense. On 18 January 2017, he moved to Mitra Kukar F.C. of Liga 1 (Indonesia) as a replacement for the departing Arthur Cunha.

After a stint in the Maldives with New Radiant SC, 31-year-old Gotor signed with Bangladeshi team Bashundhara Kings on 1 October 2018.

International career
Gotor was capped by Spain at under-17 level.

References

External links

1987 births
Living people
Footballers from Zaragoza
Spanish footballers
Association football defenders
Segunda División B players
Tercera División players
Real Zaragoza B players
RCD Espanyol B footballers
Real Murcia Imperial players
Real Murcia players
Getafe CF B players
CD Atlético Baleares footballers
CD Guijuelo footballers
CD Eldense footballers
Erbil SC players
Liga 1 (Indonesia) players
Mitra Kukar players
New Radiant S.C. players
Bangladesh Football Premier League players
Bashundhara Kings players
Spain youth international footballers
Spanish expatriate footballers
Expatriate footballers in Iraq
Expatriate footballers in Indonesia
Expatriate footballers in the Maldives
Expatriate footballers in Bangladesh
Spanish expatriate sportspeople in Indonesia